This is a list of ambassadors of the United States to the Republic of Indonesia.

Indonesia had been a Dutch colony since 1800 as a part of the Dutch East Indies. The Dutch were expelled in March 1942 by the Japanese occupation of Indonesia. After the surrender of Japan in 1945, Sukarno declared independence on August 17, 1945. However, the Netherlands attempted to reestablish their colony during a prolonged war that lasted for four and a half years. Ultimately the struggle was unsuccessful for the Netherlands, and in December 1949, the Netherlands formally recognized Indonesian sovereignty.

The United States immediately recognized the independence of Indonesia and moved to establish diplomatic relations. A U.S. embassy was established in Jakarta on December 27, 1949, under the informal direction of a consul general. President Truman appointed H. Merle Cochran as ambassador the following day.

The United States Embassy in Indonesia is located in Jakarta, with consulates in Surabaya and Medan, and a consular agency in Bali.

Ambassadors

Notes

See also
Embassy of the United States, Jakarta
Indonesia – United States relations
Foreign relations of Indonesia
Ambassadors of the United States

References
United States Department of State: Background notes on Indonesia

External links
 United States Department of State: Chiefs of Mission for Indonesia
 United States Department of State: Indonesia
 United States Embassy in Jakarta

Indonesia

United States